George Edward Frederick Rogers (born 22 August 1910, date of death unknown) was a British ice hockey player. He competed in the men's tournament at the 1928 Winter Olympics.

Rogers played as a goaltender and shared duties in the Olympic squad with the more experienced William Speechly.

Biography
Rogers was born in Alexandria, Egypt and was the son of a Liverpool cotton broker, who was managing the Egyptian end of his business at the time of his son's birth.

He attended Lyceum Alpinum Zuoz, a Swiss boarding school where ice hockey is one of the main sports.

References

1910 births
Year of death missing
Alumni of Lyceum Alpinum Zuoz
Ice hockey players at the 1928 Winter Olympics
Olympic ice hockey players of Great Britain
Sportspeople from Alexandria